Iulian Mihăescu (born 11 September 1962) is a Romanian former footballer who played as a midfielder and defender.

Career
Iulian Mihăescu was born on 11 September 1962 in Târgoviște, starting his senior career by playing as a forward at Divizia B club, Flacăra Moreni. In 1985 he was transferred at Dinamo București, where he played mainly in the defense, making his Divizia A debut under coach Mircea Lucescu on 8 March 1986 in a 3–1 victory against FCM Bacău. During his period spent with The Red Dogs, Mihăescu won two league titles in 1989–90 and in 1991–92, in the first he contributed with 7 goals scored in 27 appearances, in the second appearing in 27 games in which he scored one goal, also he won the 1989–90 cup and played 22 games with one goal scored in European competitions including 7 appearances with one goal scored in the 1989–90 UEFA Cup Winners' Cup when the club reached the semi-finals. After 6 seasons and a half spent at Dinamo in which he gained 178 Divizia A appearances with 39 goals scored, he went to play for the last two seasons of his career at Petrolul Ploiești and Sportul Studențesc, gaining a total of 205 Divizia A appearances with 39 goals scored, his last appearance taking place on 24 April 1994, playing for Sportul in a 3–1 loss against Steaua București. At international level he played one game for Romania's under-21 national team in a 1–0 victory against Austria U21 which took place on 9 September 1986 and because he never played for Romania's senior team, on 13 May 2020, Gazeta Sporturilor included Mihăescu on a list of best Romanian players who never played for the senior national team. After he ended his playing career he worked mostly as an assistant, having only a short period spent as head coach at Unirea Urziceni.

Honours
Flacăra Moreni
Divizia B: 1985–86
Dinamo București
Divizia A: 1989–90, 1991–92
Cupa României: 1989–90

References

1962 births
Living people
Romanian footballers
Romania under-21 international footballers
Association football midfielders
Liga I players
Liga II players
CSM Flacăra Moreni players
FC Dinamo București players
FC Petrolul Ploiești players
FC Sportul Studențesc București players
Romanian football managers
FC Unirea Urziceni managers